Larry Miner Gibson (born February 26, 1947) is an American businessman and was a member of the general presidency of the Young Men organization of the Church of Jesus Christ of Latter-day Saints (LDS Church) from 2009 until 2015.

Gibson was born in Boulder City, Nevada. From 1966 to 1968, he was a missionary for the LDS Church in the church's British South Mission. Gibson attended Brigham Young University and in 1985 founded Dentrix; he was the chief executive officer of Dentrix until it was purchased by Henry Schein in 1997. After the purchase, Gibson became a vice president and the chief technology officer of Henry Schein.

LDS Church service
In the LDS Church, Gibson has been a stake president and a bishop. At the April 2009 general conference of the LDS Church, Gibson was accepted as the first counselor to David L. Beck in the general presidency of the Young Men. Gibson served in this capacity until Beck was released in April 2015.

Personal life
Gibson married Shirley Barton on September 6, 1968 in the Manti Utah Temple. They have six children and live in Highland, Utah.

See also
List of general officers of The Church of Jesus Christ of Latter-day Saints

References

External links
Larry M. Gibson: Latter-day Saint official profile
Larry M. Gibson: BYU Marriott School profile

1947 births
20th-century Mormon missionaries
American Mormon missionaries in England
American chief technology officers
American leaders of the Church of Jesus Christ of Latter-day Saints
American technology chief executives
Brigham Young University alumni
Businesspeople from Utah
Counselors in the General Presidency of the Young Men (organization)
Latter Day Saints from Nevada
Latter Day Saints from Utah
Living people
People from Highland, Utah